Manreet Sodhi Someshwar is an Indian author. She is primarily known for her novels The Long Walk Home and The Taj Conspiracy.

Someshwar is an alumnus of Indian Institute of Management Calcutta. After graduating from IIM-C, she worked in Hindustan Unilever where she was an area sales manager for Gujarat and Maharashtra. She later worked in other companies in marketing and advertising before starting her writing career.

Someshwar's first novel, Earning the Laundry Stripes, was released in 2006. Her second book, The Long Walk Home was published in 2009 by HarperCollins India. The Taj Conspiracy, a thriller, is her third novel and was released in 2012.

Works

Novels
 Earning the Laundry Stripes (2006)
 The Long Walk Home (2009)
 The Taj Conspiracy (2012)
 The Hunt for Kohinoor (2013)
 The Peacock Throne Prophecy is a work-in-progress
The Radiance of a Thousand Suns (2019)

References

Indian Institute of Management Calcutta alumni
Indian women novelists
Living people
Year of birth missing (living people)